Hamler is a village in Henry County, Ohio, United States. The population was 576 at the 2010 census. It is located at the intersection of the former Baltimore and Ohio (B&O) and former Detroit, Toledo and Ironton (D, T & I) railroads and the intersection of Ohio State Route 109 and Ohio State Route 18.

History
Hamler was platted in 1874. The village was named for its proprietor, John Hamler. A post office has been in operation at Hamler since 1875.

Geography
Hamler is located at  (41.229332, -84.033313).

Demographics

2010 census
As of the census of 2010, there were 576 people, 230 households, and 158 families living in the village. The racial makeup of the village was 90.8% White, 0.3% African American, 1.0% Native American, 6.4% from other races, and 1.4% from two or more races. Hispanic or Latino of any race were 21.5% of the population.

There were 230 households, of which 35.7% had children under the age of 18 living with them, 50.9% were married couples living together, 14.3% had a female householder with no husband present, 3.5% had a male householder with no wife present, and 31.3% were non-families. 28.7% of all households were made up of individuals, and 15.6% had someone living alone who was 65 years of age or older. The average household size was 2.50 and the average family size was 3.05.

The median age in the village was 35.6 years. 27.4% of residents were under the age of 18; 11.5% were between the ages of 18 and 24; 22% were from 25 to 44; 22.6% were from 45 to 64; and 16.7% were 65 years of age or older. The gender makeup of the village was 50.0% male and 50.0% female.

2000 census
As of the census of 2000, there were 650 people, 236 households, and 173 families living in the village. The population density was 1,137.1 people per square mile (440.3/km2). There were 254 housing units at an average density of 444.4 per square mile (172.1/km2). The racial makeup of the village was 88.31% White, 0.31% African American, 10.62% from other races, and 0.77% from two or more races. Hispanic or Latino of any race were 20.62% of the population.

There were 236 households, out of which 40.7% had children under the age of 18 living with them, 62.3% were married couples living together, 9.3% had a female householder with no husband present, and 26.3% were non-families. 23.7% of all households were made up of individuals, and 12.3% had someone living alone who was 65 years of age or older. The average household size was 2.75 and the average family size was 3.29.

In the village, the population was spread out, with 31.1% under the age of 18, 7.1% from 18 to 24, 28.9% from 25 to 44, 17.8% from 45 to 64, and 15.1% who were 65 years of age or older. The median age was 31 years. For every 100 females there were 90.6 males. For every 100 females age 18 and over, there were 87.4 males.

The median income for a household in the village was $40,313, and the median income for a family was $43,516. Males had a median income of $35,750 versus $21,333 for females. The per capita income for the village was $16,264. About 5.1% of families and 6.3% of the population were below the poverty line, including 7.4% of those under age 18 and 7.3% of those age 65 or over.

Education
Hamler students attend school in the Patrick Henry Local School District, which is located on Ohio State Route 18. The district is a consolidation of the former school districts of the villages of Hamler, Deshler, Grelton, and Malinta.

Arts and culture
A village consisting primarily of residents of German heritage, Hamler is home of the annual Hamler Summerfest which features German polka bands, polka dancing, German food and free-flowing beer.

Notable people
 Kelly Creager, 1997 Miss Ohio and Miss America contestant
 Chip Davis, composer and musician

References

External links
 Hamler Summer Fests, WBGU-PBS documentaries

Villages in Henry County, Ohio
Villages in Ohio